The Cyber security (or information assurance) community in the Sri Lanka is diverse, with many stakeholders groups contributing to support the National Information and Cyber Security Strategy. The following is a list of some of these stakeholders.

Government

Computer Emergency Response Team 
Established under the Information and Communication Technology Agency in 2006, the Sri Lanka Computer Emergency Response Team (SLCERT) now functions incidentally as a government own private company under the preview of the Ministry of Digital Infrastructure and Information Technology providing the services of a computer emergency response team.

Finance Sector Computer Security Incident Response Team 
The Finance Sector Computer Security Incident Response Team (FINCSIRT) specializes in computer security relating to the banking and financial industry in Sri Lanka. It is a joint initiative between the Central Bank of Sri Lanka, SLCERT and Sri Lankan Bankers Association.

National Cyber Security Agency 
A National Cyber Security Agency has been proposed under the draft Cyber Security Bill.

See also
 Sri Lankan intelligence agencies

References 

Computer security organizations
Cybercrime in Sri Lanka
Internet in Sri Lanka
Law enforcement in Sri Lanka